KVWG-FM (95.3 FM) is a radio station  broadcasting a Classic Country format. The station is licensed to Dilley, Texas, United States, and is currently owned by David Martin Phillip and Marguerite Phillip, through licensee Rufus Resources, LLC.

History
The station was assigned the call letters KVWG-FM on 1983-04-25.  On 2001-03-02, the station changed its call sign to KRNX, on 2001-03-09 to KMFR, then on 2001-04-17 to the current KVWG.

According to FCC filings, the station (then owned by Pearshall RadioWorks) ceased operations on May 31, 2006 due to "a number of equipment-related problems" and to improve the antenna.  In 2007, after the FCC approved the new antenna's operations, the station was sold to Univision.

Effective October 16, 2014, Univision sold the station to David Martin Phillip and Marguerite Phillip's Enduring Oil Exploration, LLC for $12,500. The station's license was transferred to co-owned Rufus Resources, LLC on October 22, 2014.

References

External links

VWG-FM